Carl Warren Reindel (January 20, 1935 – September 4, 2009) was an American  actor, known for portraying Lieutenant Kenneth M. Taylor in the epic war film Tora! Tora! Tora!. He also played "Stanton" in Steve McQueen's hit film Bullitt (1968) and "Lt. Comroe" in classic science fiction film The Andromeda Strain (1971). He also made several appearances on popular TV series. In 1964, he appeared on Perry Mason as defendant and title character Barry Davis in "The Case of the Drifting Dropout," and in 1966 he played golf caddy and murderer Danny Bright in "The Case of the Golfer's Gambit." In 1966, Episode 25, on the series, Gidget, he played Scott Baker, a paid watchful eye, to make sure Gidget was safe on a weekend away at a surfboard competition. He also appeared on Gunsmoke (S7E31 - "Cale"), as the title named young cowboy set on doing things his way, but usually for good, The F.B.I., Bonanza, The Virginian (as Carl Reindell), and Voyage to the Bottom of the Sea, and also played the son of a man bent on vengeance on the western series Wagon Train before leaving show business in the early 1980s. Carl was born in Philadelphia, Pennsylvania and died of a heart attack at the age of 74, on September 4, 2009, in Valley Village, California.

TV and filmography

Naked City (TV series, 1961) - Shag
The New Breed (TV series, 1962) - Gene Garrity
Cheyenne (TV, 1962) - Terry 'Billy' Brown
Rawhide (TV, 1962) - Ben Whitney
The Virginian (TV, 1962) - Bruce McCallum
Gunsmoke (TV series, 1962–1965) - Cale / Dave Carson / Emmett Calhoun
Bonanza (TV series, 1962–1970) - Frank Wells / Andrew 'Andy' Buchanan / Billy Horn (3 episodes)
Dr. Kildare (TV series, 1963) - Joe Sartell
Laramie (TV series, 1963) - Cass
G.E. True (TV series, 1963) - Doug Tolliver
77 Sunset Strip (TV series, 1963) - Paul Atwell
Wagon Train (TV series, 1963) - Adam Bancroft
He Rides Tall (1964) - Gil McCloud
Voyage to the Bottom of the Sea (TV, 1964) - Evans
Perry Mason (TV, 1964–1966) - Danny Bright / Barry Davis
The Dick Van Dyke Show (TV series, 1965) - Gus
Combat! (TV series, 1966) - Pvt. Murray
12 O'Clock High (TV series, 1966) - Lieutenant Dickey
Gidget (TV series, 1966) - Scott
Death Valley Days (TV, 1966) - Jack Desmond / Jim Bridger
Follow Me, Boys! (1966) - Tank Captain (uncredited)
Shane (TV series, 1966) - Jed Andrews
The F.B.I. (TV series, 1966–1968) - Roy Carey / Bobby Hendricks / Gene Black
The Fugitive (TV series, 1967) - Assistant
The Mothers-In-Law (TV series, 1967) - Golf Starter
Speedway (1968) - Mike
Bullitt (1968) - Carl Stanton
Ironside (TV series, 1968–1970) - Bobby Patterson / Richy Bolton
The Thousand Plane Raid (1969) - Bombardier (uncredited)
The Gypsy Moths (1969) - Pilot
Adam-12 (TV series, 1969) - Mark Gurney
The New People (TV series, 1969) - Dan Stoner
Medical Center (TV series, 1969–1970) - Dr. Sam Hauser
The Young Lawyers (TV series, 1970) - Ernie Blake
The Cheyenne Social Club (1970) - Pete Dodge
Tora! Tora! Tora! (1970) - Lieutenant Kenneth M. Taylor
The Most Deadly Game (TV series, 1971) - Jed
The Psychiatrist (TV series, 1971) - Larry
The Andromeda Strain (1971) - Lt. Comroe
The Forgotten Man (1971, TV Movie) - Lieutenant Diamonte
Gemini Man (TV mini-series, 1976) - 8nd Agent
The Six Million Dollar Man (TV series, 1977) - Jensen
Quincy M.E. (TV series, 1980) - Roger
Buck Rogers in the 25th Century (TV series, 1981) - Air Force Sergeant (final appearance)

Sources 

Obituary – Tributes.com
Social Security Death Index

References

External links

Carl Reindel Papers dated circa 1950s-1968 contains press clippings, photos, correspondence, scripts, programs, and production posters from Broadway shows Reindel starred in along with a scrapbook and photographs of Laine Rosen are held by the Jerome Lawrence and Robert E. Lee Theatre Research Institute, The Ohio State University Libraries.

1935 births
2009 deaths
Male actors from Philadelphia
American male film actors
American male television actors
20th-century American male actors